Victoria Valley is a rural locality in the local government area of Central Highlands in the Central region of Tasmania. The 2016 census determined a population of 11 for the state suburb of Victoria Valley.

History
Victoria Valley was gazetted as a locality in 1973.

Geography
The Ouse River forms the north-eastern boundary.

Road infrastructure
The C173 route (Victoria Valley Road) enters from the south-east and runs through to the south-west, where it exits. Route C177 (Bashan Road) starts at an intersection with C173 and runs north through the locality before it exits.

References

Localities of Central Highlands Council
Towns in Tasmania